Sir Richard Stone (1913–1991) was a British economist.

Richard Stone may also refer to:
 Richard Stone (priest), Archdeacon of Lewes, 1393–1395
 Richard Stone (fencer) (1926–2006), Australian Olympic fencer
 Richard Stone (politician) (1928–2019), American politician and diplomat
 Richard Stone (anti-racism activist) (born 1937), British medical doctor and activist
 Charlie Stone (rugby league) (Richard Stone, 1950–2018), English rugby league player
 Richard Stone (painter) (born 1951), British portrait painter
 Richard Stone (composer) (1953–2001), American composer
 Richard Stone (lutenist) (born 1960),  American lutenist
 Richard Stone (sculptor) (born 1974), British sculptor and painter
 Richard Stone (born 1975), member of the Taiwanese rock band Mayday
 Ricky Stone (born 1975), American baseball pitcher